Deh Gholaman is a village in Badakhshan Province in north-eastern Afghanistan on the Wakhan River, roughly 20 miles west of Baroghil.

References

Populated places in Wakhan District
Wakhan